Raleigh County is a county in the U.S. state of West Virginia. As of the 2020 census, the population was 74,591. Its county seat is Beckley. The county was founded in 1850 and is named for Sir Walter Raleigh. Raleigh County is included in the Beckley, West Virginia Metropolitan Statistical Area.

History
Raleigh County and the surrounding area have long been home to many indigenous peoples. Early encounters describe the land as being the ancestral home of the Catawba-speaking Moneton people, who referred to the surrounding area as "okahok amai", and were allies of the Monacan people . The Moneton's Catawba speaking neighbors to the south, the Tutelo, (a tribe since absorbed into the Cayuga Nation) may have absorbed surviving Moneton communities, and claim the area as ancestral lands. Cherokee and Shawnee and Yuchi peoples also claim the area as part of their traditional lands. Waves of conflict and displacement connected to European settler-colonial conquest also resulted in varied communities finding home and refuge in southern West Virginia, becoming identified as Mingo—remote affiliates of the Iroquois Confederacy.

Raleigh County was formed on January 23, 1850, from portions of Fayette County, then a part of Virginia. Alfred Beckley (1802–88) said that he named the county for Sir Walter Raleigh (1552–1618), the "enterprising and far-seeing patron of the earliest attempts to colonize our old Mother State of Virginia".

Raleigh was one of fifty Virginia Counties that were admitted to the Union as the state of West Virginia on June 20, 1863.  Later that year, the counties were divided into civil townships, with the intention of encouraging local government.  This proved impractical in the heavily rural state, and in 1872 the townships were converted into magisterial districts.  Raleigh County was initially divided into six townships: Clear Fork, Marsh Fork, Richman, Shady Spring, Town, and Trap Hill.  These became magisterial districts in 1872, and the same year a seventh district, Slab Fork, was created from land that had previously belonged to Wyoming County.  These remained largely unchanged over the next century, but in the 1970s the seven historic magisterial districts were consolidated into three new districts: District 1, District 2, and District 3.

Heavily involved in the coal mining industry, Raleigh County has been the scene of numerous deadly incidents, of which the most severe was the Eccles Mine Disaster in 1914.  At least one hundred and eighty miners died in what was the second-worst coal mining disaster in state history.  More recently, the 2010 Upper Big Branch Mine disaster, which killed twenty-nine miners, occurred in Raleigh County. Raleigh County miners were also killed by violent suppression of labor organizing, such as in the so-called Battle of Stanaford during the 1902-1903 New River coal strike in which an armed posse led by a US Marshall who shot up miners' houses while they and their families slept, killing at least six. The perpetrators were later acquitted. The lead-up and aftermath were witnessed and widely recounted by Mother Jones, and the massacre is considered a prelude to the West Virginia coal wars.

The town of Sophia in Raleigh County was the home of Senator Robert C. Byrd.

Geography
The New River flows northwestward along the county's east border. The county terrain consists of wooded hills, carved with drainages. The terrain slopes to the north and west; its highest point is near its southmost corner, at 3,524' (1074m) ASL.

Major highways

 Interstate 64
 Interstate 77
 U.S. Highway 19
 West Virginia Route 3
 West Virginia Route 16
 West Virginia Route 41
 West Virginia Route 54
 West Virginia Route 61
 West Virginia Route 97
 West Virginia Route 99
 West Virginia Route 210
 West Virginia Route 307
 West Virginia Route 121
 West Virginia Route 20

Adjacent counties

 Kanawha County (north)
 Fayette County (northeast)
 Summers County (east)
 Mercer County (southeast)
 Wyoming County (southwest)
 Boone County (northwest)

Protected areas

 Little Beaver State Park
 New River Gorge National Park and Preserve (part)

Lakes

 Flat Top Lake
 Glade Creek Reservoir
 Little Beaver Lake
 Stephens Lake

Demographics

2000 census
As of the census of 2000, there were 79,220 people, 31,793 households, and 22,096 families in the county. The population density was 131/sqmi (50.6/km2). There were 35,678 housing units at an average density of 59/sqmi (22.8/km2). The racial makeup of the county was 89.63% White, 8.52% Black or African American, 0.19% Native American, 0.72% Asian, 0.02% Pacific Islander, 0.12% from other races, and 0.80% from two or more races.  0.92% of the population were Hispanic or Latino of any race.

There were 31,793 households, out of which 28.60% had children under the age of 18 living with them, 54.30% were married couples living together, 11.90% had a female householder with no husband present, and 30.50% were non-families. 27.10% of all households were made up of individuals, and 12.90% had someone living alone who was 65 years of age or older. The average household size was 2.38 and the average family size was 2.88.

The county population contained 21.50% under the age of 18, 8.70% from 18 to 24, 28.60% from 25 to 44, 25.70% from 45 to 64, and 15.40% who were 65 years of age or older. The median age was 40 years. For every 100 females there were 96.80 males. For every 100 females age 18 and over, there were 94.90 males.

The median income for a household in the county was $28,181, and the median income for a family was $35,315. Males had a median income of $33,000 versus $20,672 for females. The per capita income for the county was $16,233.  About 14.60% of families and 18.50% of the population were below the poverty line, including 28.70% of those under age 18 and 10.50% of those age 65 or over.

2010 census
As of the census of 2010, there were 78,859 people, 31,831 households, and 21,322 families in the county. The population density was 130/sqmi (50.3/km2). There were 35,931 housing units at an average density of 59.4/sqmi (22.9/km2). The racial makeup of the county was 88.5% white, 8.2% black or African American, 0.9% Asian, 0.2% American Indian, 0.4% from other races, and 1.7% from two or more races. Those of Hispanic or Latino origin made up 1.3% of the population. In terms of ancestry, 41.8% were American, 9.1% were English, 8.6% were German, and 8.5% were Irish.

Of the 31,831 households, 29.0% had children under the age of 18 living with them, 50.2% were married couples living together, 12.2% had a female householder with no husband present, 33.0% were non-families, and 28.6% of all households were made up of individuals. The average household size was 2.36 and the average family size was 2.87. The median age was 41.1 years.

The median income for a household in the county was $38,036 and the median income for a family was $49,837. Males had a median income of $42,405 versus $27,347 for females. The per capita income for the county was $20,457. About 14.5% of families and 17.5% of the population were below the poverty line, including 26.1% of those under age 18 and 10.2% of those age 65 or over.

Politics
Raleigh County voters have tended to vote Republican in recent decades. In 67% of national elections since 1980, the county selected the Republican Party candidate (as of 2020).

Communities

City
 Beckley (county seat)

Towns
 Lester
 Mabscott
 Sophia

Magisterial districts

Current
 District 1
 District 2
 District 3

Historic
 Clear Fork
 Marsh Fork
 Richmond
 Shady Spring
 Slab Fork
 Town
 Trap Hill

Census-designated places

 Beaver
 Bolt
 Bradley
 Coal City
 Crab Orchard
 Daniels
 Eccles
 Ghent
 Glen White
 Helen
 MacArthur
 Piney View
 Prosperity
 Shady Spring
 Stanaford

Unincorporated communities

 Abney
 Abraham
 Affinity
 Amigo
 Arnett
 Artie
 Beaver
 Besoco
 Big Stick
 Blue Jay
 Blue Jay 6
 Cedar
 Cool Ridge
 Crow
 Dorothy
 Eastgulf
 Egeria
 Fireco
 Flat Top
 Glen Daniel
 Glen Morgan
 Grandview
 Hollywood
 Hot Coal
 Hotchkiss
 Jonben
 Josephine
 Killarney
 Lego
 Lillybrook
 McAlpin
 McVey
 Montcoal
 Naoma
 New
 Odd
 Pemberton
 Pickshin
 Pinepoca
 Pluto
 Price Hill
 Princewick
 Raleigh
 Redbird
 Rhodell
 Shiloh
 Slab Fork
 Soak Creek
 Sophia
 Stotesbury
 Sullivan
 Sylvia
 Tams
 Ury
 Whitby
 White Oak
 Willibet
 Winding Gulf
 Woodpeck

See also
 Coal camps in Raleigh County, West Virginia
 National Register of Historic Places listings in Raleigh County, West Virginia
 New River Coalfield
 Little Beaver State Park
 Upper Big Branch mine explosion
 Winding Gulf Coalfield

References

External links

 Beckley-Raleigh County Chamber of Commerce
 Raleigh County Government
 Raleigh County Board of Education
 History of Raleigh County Flag

 
1850 establishments in Virginia
Populated places established in 1850
Counties of Appalachia